"Away from Home" is a song recorded by the Sweden-based musician and producer Dr Alban. It was released in May 1994 as the second single from his third studio album, Look Who's Talking. In comparison with the previous Dr Alban's singles, the song met a smaller success. But it made it to number two in Finland, number five in Spain, number 12 in Austria, number 13 in Denmark and number 17 in Switzerland. In the UK, "Away from Home" peaked at number 42 and on the Eurochart Hot 100, it reached number 25 on 20 August.

Airplay
"Away From Home" entered the European airplay chart Border Breakers at number 21 on 25 June 1994 due to crossover airplay in West Central-, East Central-, North- and South-Europe, and peaked at number five on 23 July.

Music video
The music video for "Away from Home" was directed by Jonathan Bate. He also directed the video for "Look Who's Talking".

Track listings
 CD single
 "Away from Home" (short) — 3:18
 "Away from Home" (long) — 5:18

 CD maxi'''
 "Away from Home" (short) — 3:18
 "Away from Home" (long) — 5:18
 "Away from Home" (amaway mix) — 6:10
 "Away from Home" (IMashed up version) — 4:48

Charts

References

1994 singles
Dr. Alban songs
Songs written by Kristian Lundin
Song recordings produced by Denniz Pop
Songs written by Dr. Alban
1994 songs
English-language Swedish songs
Music videos directed by Jonathan Bate